Bordeaux Métropole is the métropole, an intercommunal structure, centred on the city of Bordeaux. It is located in the center of the Gironde department, in the Nouvelle-Aquitaine region, in South West France. It represents about half of the department's population. It was created in January 2015, replacing the previous Communauté urbaine de Bordeaux. Its population was 801,041 in 2018, of which 257,068 resided in Bordeaux proper.

Bordeaux Métropole encompasses only the central part of the metropolitan area of Bordeaux (see infobox at Bordeaux article for the metropolitan area). Communes further away from the center of the metropolitan area have formed their own intercommunal structures, such as:
 Communauté de communes de Montesquieu
 Communauté de communes des Coteaux Bordelais
 Communauté de communes du Secteur de Saint-Loubès
 Communauté de communes Jalle Eau Bourde
 etc.

History 
The Urban Community of Bordeaux (French: Communauté urbaine de Bordeaux), also known by its French initials CUB, was created in 1966 by the law of 31 December on urban communities which instituted the urban communities of Bordeaux, Lille, Lyon and Strasbourg.

On 1 January 2015, the Métropole replaced the Urban Community in accordance with a law of January 2014.

Communes
The 28 communes of Bordeaux Métropole are:

Ambarès-et-Lagrave
Ambès
Artigues-près-Bordeaux
Bassens
Bègles
Blanquefort
Bordeaux
Bouliac
Le Bouscat
Bruges
Carbon-Blanc
Cenon
Eysines
Floirac
Gradignan
Le Haillan
Lormont
Martignas-sur-Jalle
Mérignac
Parempuyre
Pessac
Saint-Aubin-de-Médoc
Saint-Louis-de-Montferrand
Saint-Médard-en-Jalles
Saint-Vincent-de-Paul
Le Taillan-Médoc
Talence
Villenave-d'Ornon

Administration 
The Metropolitan Council consists of 101 members, one of them being the president, currently Alain Juppé, the mayor of Bordeaux.

Presidents of Metropolitan Bordeaux

References

External links
 
 

Metropolis in France
Bordeaux
Intercommunalities of Gironde